Donald Mëllugja (born 31 May 1995) is a professional Albanian footballer who currently plays as a midfielder for Egnatia in the Kategoria Superiore.

References

1995 births
Living people
People from Mat (municipality)
Albanian footballers
Association football midfielders
KS Burreli players
KS Iliria players
Besa Kavajë players
FK Partizani Tirana players
KS Kastrioti players
KS Egnatia Rrogozhinë players
Kategoria e Parë players
Kategoria Superiore players